The Foton Midi is a Leisure activity vehicle produced from 2008 to 2014 by Foton, a subsidiary of BAIC Group.

Overview
The original price of the Foton Midi ranged from 59,800 yuan to 66,400 yuan with two four-cylinder petrol engines available including a 1.3 litre engine producing 85 hp and a 1.5 litre engine producing 105 hp with both engines mated to a 5-speed manual gearbox.  A facelift featuring a new 1.6 litre engine option and a restyled front fascia was introduced in 2013 for the 2014 model year, but due to poor sales, the Midi was soon discontinued. The price of the Foton Midi before being phased out ranged from 59,300 yuan to 66,700 yuan.

References

External links 

 (Foton Official Website)

Foton Motor vehicles
Cars introduced in 2008
2010s cars
Minivans
Compact MPVs
front-wheel-drive vehicles
Cars of China